David Irvin (1794 – 1872) was a United States territorial judge.

Born in Albemarle County, Virginia, Irvin practiced law in Virginia. He was appointed a federal judge in Michigan Territory. In 1841, he was elected to the American Philosophical Society. When Wisconsin Territory was created, Irvin was appointed one of the justices of the Wisconsin Territorial Supreme Court and served until Wisconsin was admitted to the union on May 29, 1848. Irvin then moved to Galveston, Texas, where he bought a large tract of land. Reportedly, Irvin took part in the American Civil War on the side of the Confederacy. Irvin's court decisions were more common sense then following the law. He said his horse 'Pedro' had more common sense than the lawyers in his courtroom. He would often adjourn court to shoot prairie chickens.

References

People from Albemarle County, Virginia
People from Galveston, Texas
Wisconsin Territory judges
19th-century American judges
1794 births
1872 deaths